Alta Velocidad Española (AVE) is a service of high-speed rail in Spain operated by Renfe, the Spanish national railway company, at speeds of up to .

AVE trains run on a network of high-speed rail track owned and managed by ADIF (Administrador de Infraestructuras Ferroviarias), where other high speed (Alvia, Avlo) and mid-speed (Altaria) services also operate. The first line was opened in 1992, connecting the cities of Madrid, Córdoba and Seville. Unlike the rest of the Iberian broad gauge network, the AVE uses standard gauge. This permits direct connections to outside Spain through the link to the French network at the Perthus Tunnel. AVE trains are operated by Renfe, but private companies may be able to operate trains in the future using other brands, in accordance with European Union legislation. Some TGV-derived trains used to run on the broad-gauge network at slower speeds, but these were branded separately as Euromed until new rolling stock was commissioned for these services.

Renfe is the dominant high-speed rail operator in Spain, but private companies Ouigo España and Iryo compete on the Madrid–Barcelona route. French TGV services run from the border to Barcelona.

 translates to "Spanish High Speed", but the initials are also a play on the word , meaning "bird".

History

New rail link to Andalusia 

Towards the end of the 1980s a new line was planned to join the Castilian Meseta with Andalusia without passing through the Despeñaperros Natural Park. After considering various options it was decided that a standard-gauge line, allowing for Spain's first high-speed rail link, would be built. The project was named NAFA (Nuevo Acceso Ferroviario a Andalucía, New Rail Link to Andalusia) and was meant to help revitalise the stagnant southern Spanish economy. The line was inaugurated on 14 April 1992 to coincide with Expo 92 being held in Seville. Seven days later on 21 April 1992 commercial service began with six daily services stopping at Madrid, Seville, Córdoba, Puertollano and Ciudad Real. In October 1992 Renfe began the AVE Lanzadera (Shuttle) service between Madrid and Puertollano and Ciudad Real.

It has been suggested that the PSOE government chose the French Alstom bid over the Siemens and Talgo bids for political rather than technical reasons, rewarding the French government for its assistance in capturing ETA activists who took "sanctuary" across the border in southern France. Seville's hosting of the 1992 World's Fair prompted the choice of that city for the inaugural AVE line, with its being the home town of then Spanish prime minister Felipe González  also playing some role. Seville is the artistic, cultural, and financial capital of southern Spain and the fourth largest city in Spain, after Madrid, Barcelona and Valencia, with a population of over 700,000 and a metropolitan area of almost 1.5 million people. It is also the capital of Andalusia, Spain's most populous autonomous community (region).

In January 1993 the Talgo 200 Madrid–Málaga service began, using AVE lines as far as Córdoba and then the Córdoba–Málaga Spanish-gauge conventional track to reach Málaga. Later in 1993 the mixed-method services Talgo 200 Madrid–Cádiz and Talgo 200 Madrid–Huelva began.

In 1994 AVE trains on the Madrid–Seville line began to run at 300 km/h, cutting journey times by at least 40 minutes and covering the 471 km in  hours, though it is unlikely that much of a saving came from the increase in maximum speed, because only a small section of the line near Los Yébenes has the alignments for 300 km/h operation.  The maximum permitted speed is 270 km/h between Atocha station and Brazatortas, save for the approaches to the intermediate stations (Atocha, Ciudad Real and Puertollano). Beyond Brazatortas, the line is only authorised for 250 km/h operation, which drops to 215 km/h in the Sierra Morena mountains and 90 km/h around Córdoba station. It is more likely that time savings occurred as a result of there being fewer intermediate stops.

Although in 1999 Renfe began a mixed-service Talgo 200 Madrid–Algeciras route, this was, along with the other mixed services, transferred to Grandes Líneas Renfe (Renfe's Spanish gauge long-distance brand) following changes to plans for high-speed rail in Spain.

The last segment of the Madrid–Málaga high-speed rail line was completed on 24 December 2007 when the new high speed railway section between the cities of Córdoba and Málaga was inaugurated. It is a standard gauge railway line of 155 km in length and is designed for speeds of 300 km/h (186 mph). It has compatibility with neighbouring countries' railway systems as well.

In October 2015 an extension of the Madrid-Seville high-speed rail line to Cádiz was completed after 14 years of works and put in service by Alvia trains for speeds up to 200 km/h. In 2019 the Antequera–Granada high-speed rail line opened.

AVANT – Media Distancia 

In 1992, a new high-speed medium distance service (AV Media Distancia operating under the AVE Lanzadera brand) began between Madrid, Ciudad Real and Puertollano, using spare class 100 trains. In November 2003 a new service began between Seville and Córdoba using new class 104 trains, reducing journey times between the two cities to 40 minutes.

In 2005 the brand was renamed RENFE Avant, and all services started to use class 104 trains, leaving class 100 for AVE services.

The construction of a  stretch of high-speed line from Madrid to Toledo allowed the inauguration of a medium distance service in November 2005. The journey time between the two cities is now less than 30 minutes. The high-speed link combined with high property prices in Madrid has encouraged many Madrid commuters to settle in Ciudad Real, the first stop on the Madrid–Seville line. There has, however, been controversy over the construction of this line as the change to standard-gauge track meant that towns such as Getafe, Aranjuez and Algodor, which now have no commercial services, lost their direct services to Toledo. Furthermore, since Toledo is now connected by standard-gauge track it is impossible for other passenger or goods trains to reach it that have not come from other high-speed lines.

Further Avant services have been launched with the expansion of the AVE lines to Valladolid, Barcelona, Málaga and Galicia. See below for details of all Avant services.

In the Valladolid line, new class 114 trains are used. Both Avant class 104 and class 114 trains are Pendolino designs, without tilting capacity:

Avant class 104 trains are based in ETR 480
Avant class 114 trains are based in ETR 600

Madrid–Barcelona 

The Madrid–Zaragoza –Barcelona line was inaugurated on 20 February 2008, after parts of the line had operated since 2003 (Madrid–Zaragoza–Lleida) and 2006 (Lleida–Tarragona). The line includes a spur railway that branches off at Zaragoza towards Huesca in north Aragon. The Madrid-Huesca high-speed rail line was inaugurated in 2005.

The line currently terminates at Barcelona Sants railway station, but a new station is under construction at La Sagrera on the northern edge of the city. The Sants–La Sagrera tunnel links the Barcelona Sants station in Barcelona with the future Sagrera station through the Eixample district. The tunnel passes under and along the streets of Provença and Mallorca, while uses a short part under Diagonal avenue to link between these two streets. In the Carrer de Mallorca street, the tunnel passes directly in front of Gaudí's masterpiece, the basilica of the Sagrada Família, and in the Carrer de Provença street, near another Gaudí's architectural work, the Casa Milà. In a long campaign against this route, the Board of the Sagrada Família and other parties argued that the tunnel would damage the church, whose construction is still in progress. In this discussion about different possible routes, the one now built is also called the Provença tunnel because part of its route passes under the street of the same name.

The tunnel boring machine Barcino passed the Sagrada Família in October 2010, and reached its final destination a few months later. In March 2012, railway equipment was installed, with a special elastic isolation of the rails in order to dampen vibrations at the sections passing close to Gaudí's architectural works, using the Edilon system. Rail traffic was planned to start in 2012, initially without stops at the La Sagrera station, which was expected to be completed in 2016.  The Sants–La Sagrera tunnel was finally inaugurated on 8 January 2013 along with the Perpignan–Barcelona high-speed rail line while commercial services via the tunnel towards France begun on the following day. However, works on the Sagrera station suspended in early 2014 due to a corruption scandal involving one of the companies carrying out the works. Construction works at the station were finally resumed in 2018 and the new AVE station is now expected to open in 2023.

Northern corridors 

The first installment of a high-speed rail corridor in the north and north-west of Spain was the 179.6 km section Madrid–Segovia–Valladolid which was put in operation on 22 December 2007. The extension of the line with the 162.7 km section Valladolid–Venta de Baños–Leon was inaugurated on 29 September 2015. Valladolid will become the hub for all AVE lines connecting the north and north-west of Spain with the rest of the country. On 24 April 2010, it was announced a 55 km high-speed spur would leave the Madrid–Valladolid route at Segovia and continue to Ávila. Initial plans were expected to be complete by the end of 2010 but as of 2020 this line remains unfinished.

On 21 July 2022 a new 86.5 km section between Venta de Baños and Burgos was inaugurated after 13 years of works at an investment cost of 759 million euros and introduced a new AVE Madrid-Burgos service that cuts the journey time between the two cities down to just over an hour and a half. This section is the first expansion of the high-speed network to the north-northeast towards the Spanish region of the Basque Country and the future Basque high-speed railway line (Basque Y). It includes 2 tunnels and 12 viaducts, the longest of them passes over Pisuerga river and Autovía A-62 highway. 

In the north-west of Spain the Madrid–Galicia high-speed rail line completed on 21 December 2021 after 20 years of works when the Olmedo–Zamora–Santiago de Compostela section was finished. This line is connected to the Madrid–Leon line at Olmedo south of Valladolid.

Construction on the 87.1 km northernmost part of this section between the cities of Ourense and Santiago de Compostela began late 2004 and this part was inaugurated in December 2011. The 107 km southern section, between Olmedo (130 km north of Madrid on the Madrid–Leon line) and Zamora entered revenue service on 17 December 2015 by Alvia trains. The 110 km new built section in the middle between Zamora and Otero de Sanabria near the town of Puebla de Sanabria was put in service on 26 October 2020, while the 119.4 km last remaining part between Puebla de Sanabria and Ourense which crosses some of Spain's most remote and fragile nature areas, was completed in end 2021.  Up to that date the entire line was served by Alvia S-730 (Patito, max speed ) trains.   

This line is connected in the region of Galicia with the 156 km Atlantic Axis high-speed rail line that connects the cities of Vigo and A Coruña via Santiago de Compostela. The Atlantic Axis was inaugurated in April 2015 while the section A Coruña–Santiago de Compostela opened in 2009 and was electrified in 2011. The new railway shortened the distance between the two cities by 22 km, from 178 km to 156 km, and cut the travel time from around 3 hours on the old railway down to 1 hour and 20 minutes on the new one. 37 tunnels totalling 59 km and 34 bridges totalling 15 km form part of the rebuilt railway.

Eastern corridors 

The Madrid–Levante network connects Madrid with the Mediterranean coast of the Levante Region (Eastern Spain). The Madrid–Cuenca–Valencia line was officially finished on Friday, 10 December 2010, with commercial trips starting on Saturday 18 December 2010. The Madrid–Albacete–Alicante line was inaugurated on 17 June 2013. Trains cover the distance between Madrid and Alicante in 2 hour 12 minutes. On 22 January 2018 the extension section of the line to Castellón was inaugurated introducing a new AVE service Madrid-Castellón which cut the journey time between the two cities by further 30 minutes to total 2 hours and 25 minutes. The first stretch of the AVE service from Madrid to Murcia was inaugurated on 1 February 2021, linking Monforte del Cid, Elche and Orihuela, while the continuation up to Murcia put in service on 20 December 2022. Work is being prepared to extend the line to Cartagena. When fully operational the Madrid–Levante network will total 955 km of high-speed rail connecting Madrid, Cuenca, Albacete, Valencia, Alicante, Elche, Castellón, Murcia and Cartagena.

International connection with France 

A milestone for the AVE network was reached in December 2013 when it was connected to the rest of Europe via France. The connecting link was the construction of the  Barcelona–Figueres section of the Perpignan–Barcelona high-speed line, an extension of the Madrid–Barcelona line, completed in January 2013 at a cost of €3.7 billion. The international  Perpignan–Figueres section of the line opened in December 2010 and includes the new  Perthus Tunnel under the Pyrenees.

The high-speed Barcelona-Figueres section (from Barcelona to the French border) was officially inaugurated in January 2013. The journey from the centre of Barcelona to the centre of Girona takes now 37 minutes (compared to the previous 90 minutes), and to Figueres in 53 minutes (instead of two hours). Girona and Figueres are now 14 minutes from each other. The Perpignan (France)-Figueres section opened in 2010. One lacking high-speed section on the French side, between Montpellier and Nîmes, opened in July 2018, allowing almost continuous high-speed travel from the French high-speed network to the Spanish one. The French government, on the other hand, recently announced indefinite delays to the Montpellier-Perpignan high speed section that was originally planned for 2020.

Madrid interconnector 
On 24 April 2010, tunnelling started on the 7.3 km route connecting the 2 main stations in Madrid, Madrid Atocha and Madrid Chamartín. Electrification works for the line along with line duplication works in the section between Atocha and Torrejón de Velasco started in 2017 and these works were expected to be completed in early 2018 and the line was hoped to open for commercial service for AVE trains within the same year. A later announcement postponed the opening for the second half of 2020. However, delays in the schedule due to the COVID-19 pandemic postponed it further. In November 2021, the inauguration of the interconnector was projected to the first trimester of 2022. Test runs were being conducted in early February 2022, and the line was expected to be ready for permit application in early March.
The tunnel finally opened on July 1, 2022. 

Before this all trains going towards Valladolid left from Chamartín and trains going to Seville, Málaga, Valencia, Alicante and Barcelona left from Atocha station. Also, there is a single daily service in each direction running along the Barcelona–Seville, Barcelona–Málaga, and Barcelona-Granada routes, which uses the high-speed bypass around Madrid to avoid reversing the direction of train in Atocha station. The tunnel now allows services serving northern cities to travel non-stop or with a stop through Madrid and onward to southern cities (or vice versa), without the driver having to change ends or bypass Madrid, a valuable source of passengers. Previously someone wanting to travel from Valladolid to Alicante, for instance, had to travel from Valladolid Campo Grande station to Madrid Chamartín station before taking a Cercanías service to Atocha; then finally taking an onward train to Alicante.

Incidents and accidents 
 Santiago de Compostela derailment
 Euromed 2002 accident

Operational services 

The Spanish high-speed network is used, among others, by the following services:
 international:
 Barcelona–Lyon via Girona, Figueres, Perpignan, Narbonne, Béziers, Montpellier, Nîmes, and Valence.
 Barcelona–Paris via Girona, Figueres, Perpignan, Narbonne, Béziers, Agde, Sète, Montpellier, Nîmes, and Valence.
 Barcelona–Toulouse via Girona, Figueres, Perpignan, and Carcassonne.
 Madrid–Barcelona–Marseille via Zaragoza, Tarragona, Barcelona, Girona, Figueres, Perpignan, Narbonne, Béziers, Montpellier, Nîmes, Avignon, and Aix-en-Provence
 :
 Barcelona–Granada via Tarragona, Lleida, Zaragoza, Córdoba, Puente Genil-Herrera and Antequera.
 Barcelona–Seville via Tarragona, Lleida, Zaragoza, Ciudad Real, Puertollano, and Córdoba.
 Madrid–Alicante via Cuenca, Albacete, and Villena.
 Madrid–Barcelona via Zaragoza, Lleida, and Tarragona.
 Madrid–Burgos via Valladolid.
 Madrid–Castellón via Cuenca and Valencia.
 Madrid–Granada via Ciudad Real, Puertollano, Córdoba, Puente Genil-Herrera, Antequera and Loja.
 Madrid–Huesca via Guadalajara, Calatayud, Zaragoza, and Tardienta.
 Madrid–León via Valladolid and Palencia.
 Madrid–Málaga via Córdoba, Puente Genil-Herrera, and Antequera.
 Madrid–Murcia via Cuenca, Albacete, Elche and Orihuela .
 Madrid–Ourense via Zamora.
 Madrid–Seville via Ciudad Real, Puertollano, and Córdoba.
 Madrid–Valencia via Cuenca and Requena-Utiel.
 Málaga–Barcelona via Antequera, Puente Genil-Herrera, Córdoba, Zaragoza, and Tarragona.
 Valencia–Seville via Cuenca, Ciudad Real, Puertollano, and Córdoba.
 Valencia–Burgos via Madrid Chamartín.
 Alicante–Ourense via Albacete, Cuenca, Madrid Chamartín and Zamora. 
  (mid distance):
 A Coruña–Santiago de Compostela–Ourense.
 Barcelona−Girona−Figueres.
 Barcelona–Tarragona–Lleida.
 Barcelona–Tortosa via Camp de Tarragona, Cambrils and L'Hospitalet de l'Infant.
 Calatayud–Zaragoza.
 Madrid–Ciudad Real–Puertollano.
 Madrid–Segovia–Valladolid.
 Madrid–Toledo.
 Málaga–Córdoba–Seville via Antequera and Puente Genil-Herrera.
 Málaga–Granada via Loja.
 Murcia–Alicante via Beniel, Orihuela, Callosa Cox and Elx.
 Ourense–Santiago de Compostela–A Coruña.
 Valencia–Requena Utiel.
  (mixed high-speed/conventional):
 Alicante–Santander, via Villena, Albacete, Cuenca, Madrid, Segovia, Valladolid, Palencia and Torrelavega.
 Barcelona–A Coruña, via Lleida, Zaragoza, Pamplona, Vitoria-Gasteiz, Burgos, León, Ponferrada, Ourense and Santiago de Compostela.
 Barcelona–Bilbao, via Camp Tarragona, Lleida, Zaragoza, Tudela, Castejon, Calahorra, Logroño, Haro and Miranda De Ebro.
 Barcelona–San Sebastian, via Camp Tarragona, Lleida, Zaragoza, Tudela, Castejon, Tafalla, Pamplona, Altsasu and Zumarraga.
 Barcelona–Salamanca, via Camp Tarragona, Lleida, Zaragoza, Tudela, Castejon, Tafalla, Pamplona, Vitoria-Gasteiz, Miranda de Ebro, Burgos, Valladolid and Medina del Campo.
 Barcelona–Vigo, via  Lleida, Zaragoza, Pamplona, Vitoria-Gasteiz, Burgos, León, Ponferrada and Ourense, with connection services to Gijón in León and to A Coruña in Monforte de Lemos.
 Gijón–Oropesa Del Mar, via Oviedo, Mieres Del Camín, La Pola, León, Palencia, Valladolid, Segovia, Madrid, Cuenca, Requena Utiel, Valencia, Sagunt, Castellón and Benicàssim.
 Gijón–Alicante, via Oviedo, Mieres Del Camín, La Pola, León, Palencia, Valladolid, Segovia, Madrid, Cuenca, Albacete and Villena.
 Madrid–A Coruña, via Zamora, Ourense and Santiago de Compostela.
 Madrid–Badajoz, via Leganés, Torrijos, Talavera De La Reina, Oropesa, Navalmoral De La Mata, Monfragüe-plasencia, Cáceres and Mérida.
 Madrid–Bilbao, via Segovia, Valladolid, Burgos and Miranda de Ebro.
 Madrid–Cádiz, via Ciudad Real, Puertollano, Córdoba, Sevilla and Jerez de la Frontera.
 Madrid–Ferrol, via Segovia, Medina del Campo, Zamora, Sanabria, A Gudiña, Ourense, Santiago de Compostela, A Coruña, Betanzos and Pontedeume.
 Madrid–Gijón, via Valladolid, Palencia, León and Oviedo.
 Madrid–Huelva, via Cordoba and La Palma Del Condado.
 Madrid–Irun, via Segovia, Valladolid, Burgos, Miranda de Ebro, Vitoria-Gasteiz, Zumarraga, Tolosa and San Sebastián.
 Madrid–Logroño, via Guadalajara, Calatayud, Tudela and Calahorra
 Madrid–Lugo, via Segovia, Medina del Campo, Zamora, Sanabria, A Gudiña, Ourense, Monforte De Lemos and Sarria.
 Madrid–Cartagena, via Albacete, Hellin, Cieza, Murcia, Balsicas-mar Menor and Torre-pacheco.
 Madrid–Pamplona, via Guadalajara, Calatayud, Tudela and Tafalla.
 Madrid–Pontevedra, via Zamora, Sanabria, A Gudiña, Ourense, Santiago de Compostela and Vilagarcia De Arousa.
 Madrid–Salamanca, via Segovia and Medina del Campo.
 Madrid–Santander, via Valladolid, Palencia, Aguilar De Campoo, Reinosa and Torrelavega.
 Madrid–Santiago de Compostela, via Zamora, Sanabria, A Gudiña and Ourense.
 Madrid–Vigo, via Segovia, Medina del Campo, Zamora, Sanabria, A Gudiña, Ourense and Pontevedra.

The central hub of the AVE system is Madrid's Puerta de Atocha, except for the Madrid–León, Madrid–Burgos, Madrid–Galicia, Madrid–Alicante and Madrid-Murcia lines, that terminate at Chamartín station.

Trains 
Currently, there are several series of high-speed trains that run the AVE service:
S/100, manufactured by Alstom
S/102, manufactured by Talgo and Bombardier
S/103, manufactured by Siemens, marketed globally under the brand Siemens Velaro
S/112, manufactured by Talgo and Bombardier
There are also other series of trains that are considered high-speed, but do not run under the AVE name. They run under the brand Alvia and Avant, and are variable gauge trains. The trains that are operated under the Alvia and Avant brand are:
Avant S-104, manufactured by Alstom and CAF
Avant S-114, manufactured by Alstom and CAF
Avant S-121, manufactured by CAF and Alstom
Alvia S-120, manufactured by CAF and Alstom
Alvia S-130, manufactured by Talgo and Bombardier
Alvia S-730, manufactured by Talgo and Bombardier

Lines in operation 

Currently there are five corridors with twelve main lines in operation, and two spur lines connecting the cities of Toledo with the Madrid–Seville main line and Huesca with the Madrid–Barcelona main line.

North-western corridor

Madrid–Galicia
The Madrid–Galicia high-speed rail line connects the city of Madrid with the region of Galicia and the Atlantic Axis high-speed rail line in the North West of Spain via Segovia, Zamora, Puebla de Sanabria, Ourense and Santiago de Compostela. The line includes a new 424 km long high-speed railway section that starts at Olmedo 130 km to the north of Madrid on the Madrid–Leon high-speed rail line and ends at Santiago de Compostela. It was put in AVE service on 21 December 2021.  

AVE trains run between Madrid and Ourense with a maximum operating speed of 300 km/h and cover the distance in 2h 15min, whilst Alvia services in the line on class 130 and 730 gauge-changing trains with a commercial speed of 250km/h, connect Madrid to Santiago de Compostela, Pontevedra, Vigo, Lugo, La Coruña and Ferrol. Meanwhile certification is ongoing for the first gauge-changing Talgo AVRIL trains to operate at 330km/h in order journey times to be further reduced by 20 minutes between Madrid and Galicia. Part of the line up to Medina del Campo is also used for the Alvia Madrid–Salamanca service.

The Atlantic Axis 
The Atlantic Axis high-speed railway line is connecting the two main cities of Vigo and A Coruña (Corunna) via Santiago de Compostela in the northwestern Spanish region of Galicia. The railway, 155.6 km in length, is an upgrade of the former non electrified single railway line between the town of Ferrol and the Portuguese border for the part between A Coruña and Vigo, into a double electrified high-speed line. The new rebuilt railway permits mixed use traffic with a maximum design speed of 250 km/h for passenger trains. 

The line is served by Alvia S-121 or S-730  (max speed ) train-sets for the routes between A Coruña and Vigo and between A Coruña and Ourense and by Alvia S-730 (Patito, max speed ) train-sets connecting Galicia with other Spanish regions. The line is connected at Santiago de Compostela with the Madrid–Galicia high-speed rail line.

North corridor

Madrid–León 
The Madrid–Leon high-speed rail line connects Madrid with León passing the cities of Segovia, Valladolid and Palencia. The line supports the longest railway tunnel in Spain at 28 km in length and is served by up to two S-102 (Pato, max speed ) trains per day with the fastest schedule lasting 2 hours and 6 minutes. Other trainsets used on the Madrid–Leon line include S-120 (max speed ) and S-130 (Patito, max speed ) for the Alvia services.

Madrid–Burgos 
The Madrid–Burgos high-speed rail line connects Madrid with Burgos. The line shares a common section with the Madrid–Leon high-speed rail line up to Venta de Baños and then includes a 86.5 km long spur line up to the city of Burgos. S-112 trains are used for the AVE Madrid–Burgos service and cover the distance in 1 hour and 33 minutes by making one stop in the city of Valladolid. By January 2023 a new AVE service between Burgos and Valencia is planned to connect the two cities in 3 hour and 30 minutes.

North-eastern corridor

Madrid–Barcelona 
Madrid–Barcelona high-speed railway line connects Madrid with Barcelona in the north east of Spain passing through the cities of Guadalajara, Calatayud, Zaragoza (Saragossa), Lleida (Lérida) and Tarragona where the future Tarragona–Valencia high-speed railway line will connect. The line has a length of 621 km and a travel time of two and a half hours for the direct trains using the route avoiding entering Zaragoza (Saragossa) and Lleida (Lérida). The line is served by S-103 (max speed ) trains. Seventeen trains run now every day between 6:00 and 21:00 hrs. Direct trains Barcelona–Seville and Barcelona–Malaga that do not make a stop in Madrid are also scheduled combining the Madrid–Barcelona line with one of the southern corridor's existing lines. S-112 (Pato, max speed ) trains are used for these services and cover these distances in less than 6 hours.

Barcelona–Perpignan (France) 
The international high-speed section across the border, Perpignan–Figueres (44.4 km), of the Perpignan–Barcelona high-speed rail line opened in December 2010. Since then, French TGV trains operate from Paris. The Spanish high-speed section Barcelona–Figueres opened on 7 January 2013. Nine Spanish services initially serviced the line, with 8 being a through service to Madrid, which also connected with two French TGV services from Paris. Previously French TGV services connected Paris and Barcelona by means of a shuttle train on the standard Barcelona–Figueres line. Direct Barcelona-Paris, Madrid-Marseille, Barcelona-Lyon and Barcelona-Toulouse high-speed trains between France and Spain started on 15 December 2013.

Madrid–Huesca 
The Zaragoza–Huesca section branches off from the Madrid–Barcelona line at Zaragoza and connects with the city of Huesca and serves the connection train station for regional trains in the town of Tardienta. The line first put in operation in 2005 and is served by up to two S-102 (Pato, max speed ) trains per day with the fastest train journey between the two cities lasting 2 hours and 5 minutes.

Eastern corridor

Madrid–Castellón 
The Madrid–Castellón line connects the city of Castellón with the city of Madrid passing through the cities of Cuenca, Requena-Utiel and Valencia. The section It is serviced by S-112 (Pato, max speed ) trains, assembled by the Talgo-Bombardier consortium. Direct trains to Valencia cover the 391 km in 98 minutes while thirty trains run every day between 05:00 and 21:00, fifteen in each direction. For the service Madrid–Castellón AVE trains cover the distance in 2 hours and 25 minutes and 4 trains per day are scheduled, two in each direction. The line is part of the Madrid–Levante network (see below). Direct trains Valencia–Seville that do not make a stop in Madrid are also scheduled combining the existing lines of Madrid–Castellón and Madrid-Seville. S-102 (Pato, max speed ) trains are used for this service and cover the whole distance in 3 hours and 50 minutes.

Madrid–Alicante 
A 350 km/h line branches off from the Madrid–Castellón Line and connects the city of Alicante with the city of Madrid passing through the cities of Cuenca, Albacete and Villena. It is part of the Madrid–Levante HSR network and is serviced by S-112 (Pato, max speed ) trains that cover the distance in up to 2 hours and 12 minutes. There is also a direct Alicante-Ourense AVE service via Madrid Chamartín. Direct trains Toledo–Albacete were also scheduled in the past, combining four of the existing lines, but this service was eventually terminated due to low demand.

Madrid–Murcia 
Branching out from the Madrid–Alicante Line at Monforte del Cid to extend the network towards Murcia, this branch links Albacete, Elche, Orihuela and Murcia. The first AVE service to Orihuela was inaugurated on 1 February 2021 while the extension to Murica was inaugurated on 20 December 2022. Work is being prepared to extend the line to Cartagena. The AVE Madrid–Elche–Orihuela–Murcia daily service takes 2 hours and 45 minutes for the fastest journey served by S-112 (Pato, max speed ) trains running at maximum speed of 300 km/h. Some trains are arriving to Alicante and then reversing towards Murcia.

South corridor

Madrid–Seville 
The Madrid–Seville high-speed railway line connects Madrid with Seville in the south of Spain, passing through the cities of Ciudad Real, Puertollano and Córdoba, where the Madrid–Málaga high-speed rail line branches off towards Málaga just outside Los Mochos near Almodóvar del Río.  The route travels across the plains of Castile, travelling through the Sierra Morena mountains just before reaching Córdoba, before going onward towards Seville through the largely flat land surrounding the Guadalquivir river. The Madrid–Seville line was the first dedicated passenger high-speed rail line to be built in Spain and was completed in time for Seville's Expo 92.  With a length of 472 km, the fastest train journey between the two cities takes 2 hours and 20 minutes. The line is served by S-100 (max speed ) trains. The extension section of the Madrid-Seville high-speed rail line to Cádiz is served by Alvia trains that connect the city of Cádiz to Madrid and reach speeds up to 200 km/h in this section.

Madrid–Málaga 
The Madrid–Málaga high-speed rail line connects the city of Málaga with the city of Madrid. The line shares a common section with the Madrid–Seville high-speed rail line up to the city of Córdoba and then includes a 155 km long spur line up to the city of Málaga. It is served by S-102 (Pato, max speed ) and S-103 (max speed ) trains and the fastest train journey between the two cities takes 2 hours and 20 minutes. Apart from the traffic to and from the city of Málaga, the line also handles the traffic to the cities of Granada and Algeciras. In the future, the line will also support the traffic between Madrid and the Costa del Sol high-speed rail line.

Madrid–Toledo 
The Madrid–Toledo high-speed rail line branches off from the Seville and Málaga routes around the depot at La Sagra.  The Avant service between the two cities offers journey times of half an hour on trains with a maximum speed of 250 km/h.

Madrid–Granada 

The 122.8 km Antequera–Granada high-speed rail line is a part of the under construction Andalusian Transverse Axis high-speed rail line. The three times per day AVE service between Madrid Atocha and Granada covers the distance of 568 km in 3 h 5 min. The daily AVE train between Granada and Barcelona Sants connects the two cities in 6 h 25 min. S-102 and S-112 (Pato, max speed ) trains are used for these services and all trains call at Córdoba, offering a journey time of 90 min from Granada. The total cost of building the line was €1.4 billion.

Madrid interconnector 
A new interconnecting tunnel between Madrid Atocha and Madrid Chamartín stations opened to service in July 2022. The AVE Madrid–Alicante service having Madrid Chamartín station as a terminal station and the Burgos-Valencia service are using the Madrid interconection tunnel. Alvia services connecting Gijón to Alicante, Santander to Alicante and Gijón to Oropesa Del Mar via Valencia, are also using the Madrid interconection tunnel and are calling at Madrid Chamartín station. The Madrid–Badajoz Alvia service uses this tunnel too, starting at Madrid Chamartín and making a stop at Madrid Atocha.

Lines under construction 

Currently there are six corridors with ten lines under construction.

North corridor

León–Gijón 
 León–Oviedo–Gijón

Madrid–Asturias high-speed railway is the line connecting Madrid to the region of Asturias in the north of Spain. The new under construction section branches off the Valladolid–Vitoria high-speed section at Venta de Baños: 205 km north of Madrid and then reaches the cities of Oviedo and Gijón via Palencia and León. This section includes the 24,7 km long Pajares Base Tunnel (Variante de Pajares) which runs under a very mountainous area between the Province of León and the Principality of Asturias. Construction started in 2009 (except variante de pajares which started 2003) and reached León in September 2015. In September 2021 the first test runs started through Pajares Base Tunnel in the railway between La Robla and Campomanes.  The line is expected to put in service by May 2023.

Burgos–Vitoria 
 Burgos–Miranda de Ebro–Vitoria-Gasteiz

The extension of the Madrid–Valladolid section towards the Basque Country began construction in 2009. Originally it was to be used as a mixed-use high-speed railway line, but it has since been changed to a passenger-dedicated railway line, leaving the existing railway line for freight trains. The line was forecast to open the Valladolid–Burgos part around 2013 and the Burgos–Vitoria-Gasteiz part in 2014 or 2015. However, due to delays the line is not expected to open before 2028, although the Valladolid–Burgos section entered full revenue service in July 2022. At Vitoria it will be connected to the Basque high-speed railway line (Basque Y), thus reaching the French border. Once opened, the travel time between Valladolid and Vitoria will be around an hour.

Basque Y 
 Bilbao–Vitoria-Gasteiz–San Sebastian–French border

The Basque high-speed railway line (Basque Y) will connect the three Basque capitals, Vitoria-Gasteiz, Bilbao and San Sebastián. Construction began in October 2006 and the line was forecast to open in 2016. However, due to delays in construction, the line is expected to put in service in 2023 according to the new estimations. The three Basque capitals will be further connected with Madrid via Valladolid, and with the French border via Irun and Bayonne.

Madrid-Santander 
 Madrid–Segovia–Valladolid–Palencia–Reinosa–Santander

A new high-speed line is planned to branch off from the current Madrid–Leon high-speed rail line at Palencia and as a part of the north corridor will connect the region of Cantabria to the high-speed rail network with direct connection to Madrid. According to the plans the city of Santander will be connected via Villaprovedo and Reinosa. An agreement for completing the line by the end of 2015 was signed on 11 August 2010 including the agreement to call tenders for the section between Palencia and Villaprovedo before the end of March 2011 and for the Villaprovedo – Reinosa section before the end of 2012. However, construction works in the line started in November 2021 for the 20,8 km section between Palencia Norte and Osorno, while the section between Osorno and Reinosa was planned to be projected in 2022 and to start construction in 2023. In October 2022, construction approval was given by the Spanish government for the 20,7 km section between Osorno and Calahorra de Boedo, while tendering for the 13,7 km section between Calahorra de Boedo and Alar del Rey started in December 2022.  a total 78,4 km of the line in the part between Palencia and Alar del Rey are projected.

Eastern corridor

Alicante–Cartagena 
 Alicante–Murcia–Cartagena
This is an under construction section, part of the Madrid–Levante network of high-speed railways connecting the capital with the Mediterranean coast. The network will consist of both dedicated passenger high-speed railways designed for trains running above  and high-speed railways shared with freight trains. The network is to be opened in stages, starting with the Madrid–Valencia/Albacete section, which was opened in December 2010, followed by Albacete–Alicante in June 2013, Valencia–Castellón in January 2018, Monforte del Cid–Orihuela in February 2021 and reached the city of Murcia in December 2022, while a branch line to Cartagena is expected to follow by 2023. The section linking Valencia with Alicante in the Mediterranean Corridor was originally expected to open in 2022 but as of 2023 this is still pending.

South corridor

Seville–Antequera 
 Transversal Rail Axis (Eje Ferroviario transversal de Andalucía), the Andalusian high-speed rail line connecting Huelva, Seville, Granada and Almería. Part of the line is financed and built by the Andalusian government.

The southern Andalusian transverse high-speed railway line is a 503.7-kilometre railway running between the cities of Huelva and Almería, passing the cities of Seville and Granada. The line is designed for speeds up to 250 kilometres per hour, except for the 130-kilometre Antequera–Granada and the 103-kilometre Seville–Huelva parts of the line, which are designed for speeds in excess of 300 kilometres per hour.  A connection between Huelva and the Portuguese border is being studied. When finished the journey between Huelva and Almería in the new line is estimated to last 3 hours and 35 minutes. 

The first section Antequera–Granada was put in service on 26 June 2019 connecting the city of Granada to the rest of the high speed network via a branch from the Madrid–Málaga high-speed rail line. Construction in the 128 km section between Seville and Antequera started in 2005 under the responsibility of the Regional Government of Andalusia on a route that includes Sevilla-Santa Justa, Seville Airport, Los Alcores Tunnel, Marchena, Osuna, Pedrera and Antequera-Santa Ana. However, since 2013 construction works are halted due to lack of funding with platform works in the 75 km section between Marchena and Antequera to be completed at a cost of 288 million euros, but with the remaining part between Sevilla-Santa Justa and Marchena to remain incomplete.  the Government of Andalusia is planning to start studies in order to find new financing possibilities and continue the project. Works in the section between Granada and Almería have not started yet and completion is forecast no earlier than 2030.

Madrid–Jaén 
 Madrid–Alcázar de San Juan–Jaén
This high-speed railway line will be part passenger-dedicated high-speed railway (Madrid–Alcázar de San Juan) and part shared with freight trains (Alcázar de San Juan–Jaén). The first 99 km of the line will use the already existing Madrid-Seville high-speed railway line. From there, a 67.5 km branch line will be constructed towards Alcázar de San Juan.

From Alcázar de San Juan the existing railway line will be upgraded to allow passenger trains to run up to 250 km/h; a new double-tracked route through the Despeñaperros mountain range will be built to replace the existing single-tracked route. This part of the high-speed railway also forms part of the Madrid–Algeciras freight corridor.

Construction for this line was approved by the Spanish government on 15 July 2005 and works were planned to begin in 2008. However, works were paralyzed for years before they resumed in November 2017. The first section between Grañena and Jaén with a total length of 16,7 km was completed in March 2020.  

An extension of the line to Granada is being investigated; however, the complicated terrain between Jaén and Granada might make it uneconomical.

Mediterranean corridor

Tarragona–Almería 
 Tarragona–Valencian Community–Murcia Region–Almería

The section linking Tarragona to Almería via Valencia and Murcia is expected to be completed by 2026 when the currently under construction 184 km Murcia–Almería high-speed rail line will be finished. Its first 46,5 km new built cut-off part between Camp de Tarragona and Vandellòs started commercial services on 13 January 2020. A new dual-gauge high speed rail track on the 72 km part between Valencia and Castellón inaugurated in January 2018. The section between Vandellòs and Castellón is an upgraded line of the old Iberian-gauge Valencia−Sant Vicenç de Calders railway currently used by the Euromed service in speeds up to 220 km/h that covers distance of 400 km between the cities of Barcelona and Valencia in 2 hours and 35 minutes. With a new line, it will take about 1 hour and 45 minutes on high speed trains to cover the same distance. However, this part is not under construction yet for a new standard-gauge high speed line. The section linking Valencia with Alicante is expected to be completed by the year 2023. The 52 km part between Torrent outside Valencia and Xàtiva, which is still under construction since October 2002, was initially expected to be completed by end 2020 and it is designed for speeds up to 350 km/h. Modernization works in the 40 km single track in the remaining part between Xàtiva and La Encina Hub for maximum speed of 260 km/h including conversion to standard-gauge high speed line were expected to be completed by end 2022, but as of 2023 they are still in testing phase. Additional works for adding a double track in the same section are expected to be finished by begging 2025 at latest. The final section between Almería and Algeciras, passing through Málaga, will be built at a later point in time and an alternative and longer route looks likely.

South-western corridor

Madrid–Extremadura 
 Madrid–Toledo–Talavera de la Reina–Plasencia–Cáceres–Mérida–Badajoz

This line was initially planned as Lisbon–Madrid high-speed rail line in order to connect the two peninsular capitals, Madrid and Lisbon in 2 hours and 45 minutes. This line had been a key issue in bilateral summits in recent years and was about to link Spain's high-speed rail network with the planned High-speed rail in Portugal, a project announced by the Portuguese government in February 2009. Construction on the Spanish side began in late 2008 on a segment between the cities of Badajoz and Mérida. Both Spanish and Portuguese track were to be completed around 2013, later the Portuguese government brought forward its plans from 2015 but the Portuguese froze works in June 2011 and eventually cancelled the project in March 2012. In 2016 the European Union's European Regional Development Fund, gave Spain €205.1m towards the €312.1m needed for the track between Navalmoral de la Mata and Mérida, Spain. The section on the Spanish side between Madrid and Badajoz is expected to be completed in 2023.

With a length of 439 km on the Spanish side, of which 48 km are part of the already built Madrid–Seville high-speed rail line, the original plan was to connect cities like Talavera de la Reina, Navalmoral de la Mata, Plasencia, Cáceres, Mérida and Badajoz to Madrid. The Almonte River Viaduct was completed in May 2016 to carry this line. It is a concrete arch bridge with a span of 384 meters (1,260 feet), ranking among the longest in the world of this type of bridge. For the section between Madrid and Oropesa a new Informative Study was awarded by the Ministry of Public Works in February 2018 in order to propose alternative routes with lower environmental impact than those in the initial study from 2008. In November 2020 the new study was approved by the Ministry of Transport and in the revised proposal the city of Toledo was added in the route by the use of the existing high speed section between Madrid and Toledo. The new introduced 127 km section with budget of €1.3 billion starts from Toledo and passes through the cities of Talavera de la Reina and Oropesa until it reaches the border of the Province of Toledo with new stations planned in all those three cities. 

The section between Plasencia and Mérida was originally planned to put in service by end 2021. However, the first part given to service was the entire 150km section between Plasencia and Badajoz that was inaugurated on 18 July 2022 at an investment cost of €1.7 billion. It is a double Iberian gauge line that is due to be changed to standard gauge in the future. The total budget for the Madrid–Extremadura line is €3.7 billion.

Two Seas corridor

Zaragoza–Pamplona 
 Zaragoza–Castejon–Pamplona

A high-speed track between Zaragoza (Aragon) and Pamplona (Navarre) is currently under development as a part of the Two Seas (Cantabrian-Mediterranean) corridor. The section between Castejon and Pamplona (both in Navarre) with a total length of 75.5 kilometers is under construction with some sub-sections already completed. The line is expected to be completed by 2023.

Lines planned 

In the short term, other connections to the LGV are planned.  After the connection to France at La Jonquera in Catalonia, another connection is proposed at Irun in the Basque Country. Other new lines are under consideration, including a line connecting Soria to the Madrid–Barcelona line at Calatayud. Finally, the Madrid–Barcelona line currently terminates in Barcelona's Estació de Sants, but a new station is under construction at La Sagrera on the northern edge of the city.

In the long term, the Spanish government has an ambitious plan to make  of high-speed railway operational, with all provincial capitals at most only 4 hours from Madrid, and  hours from Barcelona. According to the Strategic Plan for railway infrastructures developed by the Spanish Ministerio de Fomento (Ministry of Public Works), called PEIT, and published in 2005, a second expansion program is planned to start when the last lines of the first program still under construction begin operation. This plan initially had a ten-year scope, ending in 2020, and its ambition was to make the  network reach  by the end of that year. However, this program has been now postponed to indefinite time frame since the first expansion program is still on going. When both programs will be completed, the Spanish high-speed network will be the most extensive network in Europe, with several operational links with France and Portugal, and this is the most ambitious high-speed rail plan in the European Union.

Connection with Barajas Airport 
In May 2021 the Spanish Ministry of Transport, Mobility and Urban Agenda announced its plans to connect Madrid's Adolfo Suárez Madrid–Barajas Airport with the AVE network. According to the plans this is going to be realized in two phases. In the first short-term phase, AVE trains will reach the airport by sharing a line with the Cercanías trains until Chamartín station. Tendering for these works is planned to start within 2022. In long-term during the second phase, a dedicated high-speed line will be constructed to connect the airport.

Cantabrian Sea corridor 
 Galicia–Asturias–Cantabria–Basque Country–French border

The 430 km high-speed line will connect Ferrol in Galicia with Bilbao in the Basque Country passing through the regions of Asturias and Cantabria along the Cantabrian Sea coast in the north Spain. The line will be further connected to the Atlantic Axis high-speed rail line on the west, the Basque Y high-speed railway line on the east and the north corridor (future Madrid-Gijón high-speed railway line) in Asturias region. The travel time between El Ferrol and Bilbao in the new line is estimated to last 1 hour and 48 minutes. The line is not yet projected, although the initial plan was for completion before 2024.

Two seas corridor 
 Valencian Community–Aragon–La Rioja–Navarre–Basque Country–French border

The line will connect the Valencian Community with the Basque Country region and the French border passing through the regions of Aragon, Navarre and La Rioja, with further connection to the TGV network via Irun towards Bordeaux and Paris. The line will include two connections between the region of Aragon and the Basque Country, one via Pamplona in Navarre towards the French border and one via Logroño in La Rioja towards Bilbao. Connected cities will include Valencia, Teruel, Zaragoza, Pamplona, Logroño, Vitoria-Gasteiz, San Sebastián and Bilbao with possible further connection to Santander. The travel time between Valencia and Bilbao in the new high-speed line will be decreased from 9 hours down to roughly 4 hours. Some sections between the regions of Aragon, Navarre and La Rioja are projected, while the section between Castejon and Pamplona is currently under construction. The Ministry of Development has not set a target date to complete the Cantabrian-Mediterranean corridor yet.

Central-Pyrenees corridor 
 Zaragoza–Huesca–French border–Toulouse

A new high-capacity rail connecting Spain with France on international standard gauge track is considered via a 40 km tunnel through the central  Pyrenees mountains. The line, also called Trans-Pyrenean Central Corridor (Travesía Central de los Pirineos) or TCP project, will serve both passenger high-speed trains as well as large freight trains and will connect directly Zaragoza to Toulouse via Huesca a distance of 355 km in length. Ten possible alternatives are being considered for crossing the mountains, all of them including tunnels at low altitude and other possible stops include Tarbes or Pau. There is currently no clear provision on its construction.

Passenger usage
The still-growing network transported a record 21.3 million passengers in 2018.  Though the network length is extensive, it lags in ridership behind comparable high-speed rail systems in Japan, France, Germany, China, Taiwan, and Korea.

See also

Other high-speed rail services
 Intercity-Express
 TGV
 Eurostar and Thalys
 YHT
 Le Frecce
 Shinkansen

Rail infrastructure in Spain and Europe
 Rail transport in Spain
 High-speed rail in Europe
 Train categories in Europe

Notes

References

External links 

 AVE (Renfe)

AVE high-speed trains
Renfe
High-speed rail in Spain